Ctenoplusia camptogamma is a moth of the family Noctuidae. It is found in Africa including Kenya.

References 

Plusiinae
Moths of Africa
Moths described in 1910